The Micajah T. Singleton House is an historic 1891 residence in DeSoto County, Florida. It is located in Arcadia, Florida at 711 West Hickory Street. It was added to the National Register of Historic Places on August 6, 2013.

The home is one of the few remaining examples in Arcadia of a large, frame vernacular architecture, pioneer home. It was constructed of heart yellow pine.

Micajah T. Singleton (1850-1923) was from a prominent North Georgia family and came to Arcadia in 1888 to operate the Peace River Phosphate Company. When the phosphate boom busted, the Singleton family left Arcadia in 1893.

 Erma Whitlock purchased the Singleton House in 1936 for her parents Mr. and Mrs. George Whitlock and younger siblings. Miss Whitlock took up residence there when World War II ended. She resided there until her death in 1993. Her nephew George Whitlock is the current owner and lives in the home. It is a cherished gathering spot for the Whitlock family.

See also
Arcadia Historic District
National Register of Historic Places listings in DeSoto County, Florida

References

Buildings and structures in DeSoto County, Florida
Houses completed in 1891
Houses on the National Register of Historic Places in Florida
Vernacular architecture in Florida
Houses in DeSoto County, Florida
National Register of Historic Places in DeSoto County, Florida
1891 establishments in Florida